Riviera Beach is a census-designated place in Anne Arundel County, Maryland, United States. The population was 12,677 at the 2010 U.S. census.

Geography
The community is bounded by two tidal inlets of the Patapsco, Rock Creek to the southeast and Stoney Creek to the northwest.

Demographics

As of the census of 2000, there were 12,677 people, 4,817 households, and 3,373 families residing in the CDP. The racial makeup of the CDP was 91.6% White, 4.1% African American, 0.2% Native American, 1.1% Asian, 0.00% Pacific Islander, 0.7% from other races, and 2.3% from two or more races. Hispanic or Latino of any race were 2.8% of the population.

There were 2,100 households, out of which 29.9% had children under the age of 18 living with them, 51.9% were married couples living together, 12.5% had a female householder with no husband present, and 30% were non-families. 22.7% of all households were made up of individuals, and 7.7% had someone living alone who was 65 years of age or older. The average household size was 2.63 and the average family size was 3.08.

In the CDP, the population was spread out, with 22.8% under the age of 18, 6.0% from 18 to 24, 29.4% from 25 to 44, 27.6% from 45 to 64, and 11.9% who were 65 years of age or older. The median age was 37.3 years. For every 100 females, there were 96.3 males. For every 100 females age 18 and over, there were 93.1 males.

The median income for a household in the CDP was $79,645, and the median income for a family was $82,567. Males had a median income of $59,861 versus $44,379 for females. The per capita income for the CDP was $33,507. About 3% of families and 5.5% of the population were below the poverty line, including 6.8% of those under age 18 and 7.9% of those age 65 or over.

References

External links

Riviera Community Improvement Association Website

Census-designated places in Maryland
Census-designated places in Anne Arundel County, Maryland
Maryland populated places on the Chesapeake Bay